Dennis Barton Dugan (born September 5, 1946) is an American director, actor, writer, artist and comedian. He is known for his partnership with comedic actor Adam Sandler, for whom he directed the films Happy Gilmore, Big Daddy, The Benchwarmers, I Now Pronounce You Chuck & Larry, You Don't Mess with the Zohan, Grown Ups, Just Go with It, Jack and Jill and Grown Ups 2. Dugan is a four-time Golden Raspberry Award for Worst Director nominee, winning once.

Life and career
Dugan was born in Wheaton, Illinois, the second of four sons of Marion, a housewife, and Charles Dugan, an insurance executive. He graduated from The Goodman School of Drama at the Art Institute of Chicago (now at DePaul University) and started his acting career in 1969 in New York City. He moved to Hollywood in 1972 and appeared in his first TV show, The Sixth Sense. Later, he played in the 1973 TV movie The Girl Most Likely to.... Other early film appearances include Night Call Nurses (1972), Night Moves (1975), Smile (1975),  Harry and Walter Go to New York (1976) and Norman... Is That You? (1976). In 1979, he was cast as the time-displaced hero in Unidentified Flying Oddball, Disney's very loose adaptation of A Connecticut Yankee in King Arthur's Court. In 1981, he appeared in Joe Dante'sThe Howling.

Dugan made guest appearances on several TV series during the 1970s including The Mod Squad, The Waltons, Cannon, Columbo, The Rockford Files, and Alice. He also appeared in the mini-series Rich Man, Poor Man, as well as  two episodes of M*A*S*H and in 1978 starred in the short-lived series Richie Brockelman, Private Eye, a spin-off from The Rockford Files.

He took on a recurring role as an aspiring caped crusader who called himself "Captain Freedom" on Hill Street Blues. He also appeared on Empire (1984) and Shadow Chasers (1984). He played Walter Bishop, briefly the husband of Maddie Hayes (Cybill Shepherd) on Moonlighting. Dugan's other film credits of the 1980s include Water (1985), Can't Buy Me Love (1987), She's Having a Baby (1988), The New Adventures of Pippi Longstocking (1988) and Ron Howard's Parenthood (1989).

Dugan launched a career as a television and film director, making cameo appearances in many of his films. Ones he directed include the comedy Problem Child (1990), Brain Donors (1992), the comedy Saving Silverman (2001) (in which Dugan plays a football referee), the comedy National Security (2003), and the Adam Sandler comedies Happy Gilmore (1996) (in which Dugan plays Doug Thompson, the golf tour supervisor) and Big Daddy (1999) (with Dugan as a man who reluctantly gives candy to a trick-or-treating Julian). Dugan has directed episodes of such television series as Moonlighting (was also a guest star in some episodes), Ally McBeal, and NYPD Blue.

Dugan directed The Benchwarmers (2006), a comedy co-produced by Sandler, about a trio of men who try to make up for missed opportunities in childhood by forming a three-player baseball team to compete against Little League squads. Dugan himself has a bit part as Coach Bellows. He then directed two more Sandler vehicles, I Now Pronounce You Chuck and Larry (2007) and You Don't Mess with the Zohan (2008).

Dugan directed Grown Ups (2010), which follows a group of high school friends who are reunited after thirty years for the Fourth of July. The film again stars Sandler, along with Kevin James, Chris Rock, Rob Schneider, and David Spade; it was released in the summer of 2010 with major box office success.

Dugan's Just Go with It (2011) was his sixth film with Sandler; it also starred Jennifer Aniston and Brooklyn Decker. Dugan directed Jack and Jill (2011), again with Sandler, and Grown Ups 2 (2013), with Sandler, James, Rock and Spade, all reprising their roles. Schneider was unable to do so due to scheduling conflicts.

To date, Dugan's films have grossed over $1.8 billion worldwide.

Personal life
Dugan's first marriage was to actress Joyce Van Patten in 1973.  They divorced in 1987, and he later wed Sharon O'Connor, to whom he is still married.

In June 2009, Dugan's son, Kelly, was drafted with the 75th overall selection by the Philadelphia Phillies in the Major League Baseball Draft. A graduate of Notre Dame High School of Sherman Oaks, California, he played for five of the club's minor league teams through 2015, followed by shorter stays in the Chicago Cubs (2016) and Arizona Diamondbacks (2017) organizations before moving on to independent baseball (2018-2022).

Filmography

Film
Director

Acting roles

Television

TV movies
 The Shaggy Dog (1994)
 A Screwball Homicide (2003)
 Karroll's Christmas (2004)

References

External links

1946 births
20th-century American male actors
Actors from Wheaton, Illinois
American male film actors
American male television actors
American television directors
Comedy film directors
Film directors from Illinois
Living people
Male actors from Illinois
Van Patten family